Tibor Weißenborn (born 20 March 1981 in West Berlin) is a field hockey player from Germany, who was a member of the Men's National Team that won the bronze medal at the 2004 Summer Olympics and the gold medal at the 2008 Summer Olympics  He was also a member of both the teams that won the 10th World Cup in Malaysia in 2002, and 11th World Cup in Germany in 2006.

International senior tournaments
 1999 – European Nations Cup, Padua (1st place)
 2000 – Champions Trophy, Amstelveen (2nd place)
 2000 – Summer Olympics, Sydney (5th place)
 2001 – European Indoor Nations Cup, Luzern (1st place)
 2001 – Champions Trophy, Rotterdam (1st place)
 2002 – 10th World Cup, Kuala Lumpur (1st place)
 2002 – Champions Trophy, Cologne (2nd place)
 2003 – European Indoor Nations Cup, Santander (1st place)
 2003 – 1st World Indoor Cup, Leipzig (1st place)
 2003 – European Nations Cup, Barcelona (1st place)
 2004 – Summer Olympics, Athens (3rd place)
 2005 – European Nations Cup, Leipzig (3rd place)
 2005 – Champions Trophy, Chennai (4th place)
 2006 – Champions Trophy, Terrassa (2nd place)
 2006 – 11th World Cup, Mönchengladbach (1st place)
 2007 – European Nations Cup, Manchester (4th place)
 2007 – Champions Trophy, Kuala Lumpur (1st place)

References

External links

1981 births
Living people
German male field hockey players
Olympic field hockey players of Germany
Olympic gold medalists for Germany
Olympic bronze medalists for Germany
Field hockey players at the 2000 Summer Olympics
2002 Men's Hockey World Cup players
Field hockey players at the 2004 Summer Olympics
2006 Men's Hockey World Cup players
Field hockey players at the 2008 Summer Olympics
Field hockey players from Berlin
Olympic medalists in field hockey
Medalists at the 2008 Summer Olympics
Medalists at the 2004 Summer Olympics
HC Bloemendaal players
Rot-Weiss Köln players
Expatriate field hockey players
German expatriates in the Netherlands